European Sun is a compilation of rare and unreleased tracks by former Josef K vocalist, Paul Haig. The album was released in 1988 on Belgian independent label Les Disques Du Crepuscule.

Interspersed between the rare a-sides and b-sides are tracks from Haig’s unreleased album, shelved by Island Records in 1985. Several tracks recorded during the Island sessions did, however, appear on the 1986 album The Warp Of Pure Fun.

Also included is the unreleased collaboration with Sheffield’s Cabaret Voltaire and a home demo, "Psycho San Jose".

In 2004, LTM released another compilation of rare material, Then Again; this duplicated several tracks from European Sun.

Track listing 
 Running Away
 Chance
 Justice
 Swinging For You
 Shining Hour
 Blue For You
 Ghost Rider
 Torchomatic
 Endless Song
 Closer Now
 Dangerous Life
 The Executioner
 Psycho San Jose
 On This Night Of Decision
 World Raw

Paul Haig albums
1988 compilation albums